Appleford/Parsons-Banks Arboretum (24 acres) is a non-profit arboretum and country estate located at 770 Mount Moro Road, Villanova, Pennsylvania.

In 1728 Robert Jones erected a one-story stone farmhouse on the site, parts of which still stand. The house was enlarged and updated over the years, and the property grew to be as large as  before it was broken up circa 1900. Today's estate was created in the 1920s by landscape architect Thomas Sears and architect R. Brognard Okie, and contains the furniture and collections of its last owners, Lewis and Anabel Parsons. Mrs. Parsons 
donated the property in 1973 to Lower Merion Township.

The arboretum contains streams and ponds, woods, rhododendron stands, a rose garden, copper beeches, stone walls, and a series of formal gardens.

See also
 List of botanical gardens in the United States

References

Arboreta in Pennsylvania
Botanical gardens in Pennsylvania
Parks in Montgomery County, Pennsylvania